Prague Business Journal or PBJ was an English-language business newspaper published in the Czech Republic from 1996 to December 2003.

History and profile
The PBJ was founded in 1996. Its founder and publisher was the New World Publishing which also used to publish the Warsaw Business Journal in Poland and the Budapest Business Journal in Hungary. The company was headed by Stephen A. O'Connor, a US media entrepreneur. The PBJ in addition to the others mentioned above was a leading publication in its category. 

The paper introduced itself as "the Czech Republic's leading English language business publication." Chris Johnstone served as managing editor of the PBJ.

It covered the financial and political news in regard to the Czech Republic's economy as well as news on arts and entertainment. The paper was a major competitor to another English-language weekly, Prague Post. The PBJ ceased publication in December 2003. Czech Business Weekly is the successor of the magazine.

References

1996 establishments in the Czech Republic
2003 disestablishments in the Czech Republic
Daily newspapers published in the Czech Republic
Defunct newspapers published in the Czech Republic
English-language newspapers published in the Czech Republic
Newspapers published in Prague
Newspapers established in 1996
Publications disestablished in 2004